The Passion of Rumi is an album by Shahram Nazeri to commemorate the international Year of Mawlana Jalal ad-Din Balkhi Rumi.

Description
Passion of Rumi is a celebration of the poetry of Rumi with a new and fresh musical approach, commemorating the international year of Mawlana Jalal ad-Din Balkhi Rumi. This recording is the first work of Shahram Nazeri in collaboration with his son, Hafez Nazeri, the composer of this work. Shahram Nazeri, the best-known vocalist of Iran, has been a pioneer in incorporating the poetry of Rumi in Persian classical music. This live recording was made at a historical festival in Iran with more than 140,000 attendees over 5 days at the Sa'ad Abad Palace in Tehran. Passion of Rumi will attract not only lovers of classical and folk Persian music, and admirers of the phenomenal poetry of Rumi, but also audiences who enjoy innovation and the beautiful harmony that can be created from the combination of different musical traditions and cultures.

Track listing
Mystic, Poet: Rumi
EVAN Madaen 
Enchanted I, Poet: Shahram Nazeri - Hafez Nazeri
Journey to Eternity
Fanayam Man ı, Poet: Rumi 
Beyond, Poet: Rumi
Fanayam Man, Poet: Rumi
In Solitude
The passion of Rumi, Poet: Rumi

Personnel
Vocals by Shahram Nazeri
Composed by Hafez Nazeri
Mohammad Firouzi: Barbat
Shervin Moahjer: Kamancheh and Kamancheh alto
Pejham Akhavas: Tombak and Damam
Hafez Nazeri: Setar
Siavash Nazeri: daf

External links

amazon.com, KereshMeh.com

Shahram Nazeri albums